Bates Cobblestone Farmhouse is a historic home located at Middlesex in Yates County, New York.  The farmhouse was built about 1836 and is a one-and-a-half-story, five bay cobblestone building with a one-and-a-half-story frame rear wing.  The house is built of relatively rough and irregularly shaped, sized and colored field cobbles. The farmhouse is among the nine surviving cobblestone buildings in Yates County.  Also on the property are two early 20th century contributing support structures.

It was listed on the National Register of Historic Places in 1992.

References

Houses on the National Register of Historic Places in New York (state)
Cobblestone architecture
Houses completed in 1836
Houses in Yates County, New York
National Register of Historic Places in Yates County, New York